2009 was the first year of participation to the Championship for the Toulouse Olympique rugby league club. Toulouse was allowed special dispensation to field five overseas players in their first season. The new Toulouse team was composed of 9 full-time players, 13 part-time players and 10 members of the Toulouse academy.  With a largely renewed team and a lack of preseason (only friendly with the Dragons cancelled due to the weather), the TO started its season with a series of defeat. Its first match in the Championship proved to be too much of a challenge with a hammering 70-0 at Widnes in front of Sky cameras. However, after the victory away against Batley, the TO accumulated victories and looked on track for a top 4 spot.

The match against Featherstone at home in June however marked another turning point in the season. With the injury of the play maker Nathan Wynn and several referee decisions going against the team, the TO lost the match. Without Wynn, at the crucial time where the team was to be opposed to the favourite of the Championship, the TO lost 4 games in a row. With Wynn coming back a win away at Featherstone was a short lived success. An unexpected defeat at home against Gateshead in battle for relegation removed almost any chance left of making the playoffs. Without much stakes left in the Championship (given the absence of relegation for the TO in its first 3 seasons in Championship), Toulouse lost also two of its last 3 matches at Leigh and Halifax.

The final ranking of Toulouse, 10 out of 11, does not represent fairly the quality of a team who won 9 out of 20 matches in a very competitive division where the final champion, Barrow, won only 13 of its matches.

Fixtures and results

League table

2009 Squad and players' statistics

 Source : www.championshipstats.rlfans.com, FFR13. Are only included players who played at least one game in the season.

External links
 Toulouse Olympique official website

References

Toulouse Olympique season
Toulouse Olympique
2009 in French rugby league
French rugby league club seasons